Alex Nicholls may refer to:

 Alex Nicholls (footballer) (born 1987), English footballer
 Alex Nicholls (academic) (born 1964), lecturer in social entrepreneurship at the University of Oxford
 Alex Nicholls (rugby union) (born 1961), Zimbabwean rugby union player